Jinggu, may refer to:

Jinggu Dai and Yi Autonomous County, an autonomous county in Yunnan, China

Jinggu Town, a town in Jinggu Dai and Yi Autonomous County, Yunnan, China